The Orto dei Semplici Elbano (1 hectare) is a botanical garden located at 160 meters elevation next to the Eremo di Santa Caterina in Rio nell'Elba on the island of Elba, Province of Livorno, Italy. It is open daily except Mondays in the warmer months; an admission fee is charged.

The garden was established in 1997 for the study of the bio-diversity of plants on Elba and elsewhere in the Tuscan Archipelago. It contains medicinal plants and fruit trees, as well as spontaneous and naturalized species.

See also 
 List of botanical gardens in Italy

References

External links
 Orto dei Semplici Elbano
 Istituto e Museo di Storia della Scienza description (Italian)
 Cultura Toscana description (Italian)
 Elba Online description (Italian)
 Photographs
 Horti entry

Botanical gardens in Italy
Elba
Gardens in Tuscany
Rio, Italy